Nagdlunguak 1948 is a sports club from Greenland based in Ilulissat. However, all league games are played in the national stadium in Nuuk.

N-48 have been national football champions twelve times. They beat B-67 Nuuk 2-2, 6-5 on penalties in the 2022 final.

Achievements 
Greenlandic Football Championship: 12
Champion : 1977, 1978, 1980, 1982, 1983, 1984, 2000, 2001, 2006, 2007, 2019, 2022

Squad

References 

Football clubs in Greenland
Association football clubs established in 1948
Ilulissat
1948 establishments in Greenland
Handball clubs in Greenland